Norbert Müller-Everling (born 27 March 1953) is a contemporary German artist working with concrete art.

Time line

Style 

Norbert Müller-Everling is an artist characterised by his unique philosophy and usage of colour in his work. 
1973–79 he was studying at the Kunstakademie Düsseldorf as a student of Erwin Heerich, afterwards philosophy in Aachen. He began developing his own style in the early 1980s. His work of that time is characterised to create forms which follow the tradition of concrete art, as Max Bill and others founded it. He sought to create objects so that the new science of form could be experienced by the senses. A prime example of his sculptural work is his Percent for Art work for the Bundesverteidigungsministerium Bonn, (1997). His later works are characterised by using colour sparingly in objects in material form of coloured paraffin. He developed his own style of having light be the medium of the work itself. It allows his work to be independent of connections to any kind of representation.

List of special works 

 1989 – Goethe-Institut Lima
 1992 – Logarithmische Wassertreppe, Sozialgericht Cologne
 1994 – Clemens-Hastricht-Platz, Cologne-Bickendorf
 1994 – Suermondt-Ludwig-Museum Aachen
 1997 – Bundesverteidigungsministerium Bonn

Solo exhibitions (selected)

 1991: Aine Art Museum Tornio in Finland
 1994: art multiple Düsseldorf
 2000: Stadtmuseum Siegburg
 2007: Die krumme Wahrheit des Raums, Kunstbüroberlin, Berlin, Germany (with Norvin Leineweber, Dirk Radtke and Heiner Thiel)
 2008: kunst & kommunikation Bochum
 2018: Art Pütz, Montzen, Belgium
 2022: Konkretionen des Lichts - Stiftung für Konkrete Kunst Roland Phleps, Freiburg im Breisgau

Group exhibitions (selected)
 1988 – Pyramiden“, Internationales Kongresszentrum Berlin u. Galerie Jule Kewenig, Frechen
 1998 – BBK-Köln, Stapelhaus 
 1998 – 1. Biennale für konkrete Kunst, Künstlerforum Bonn
 1999 – 7 konkrete Künstler im Brunswiker Pavillon, Kiel 
 1999 – „gruppe konkret“ und Gäste, Museum Abtei Liesborn 
 1999 – International Art Festival, Naju, Süd-Korea
 2000 – Gesellschaft für Kunst und Gestaltung, Bonn (mit Norvin Leineweber)
 2001 – 3. Biennale für konkrete Kunst, Andernach
 2001 – „Logik und Poesie in der konkreten Kunst“, Haus Dacheröden, Erfurt
 2001 – 4 Konkrete aus Rheinland-Pfalz, Landtag, Mainz
 2002 – „Transparent – Transluzid“, Galerie Renate Bender, München
 2002 – „Übersicht“ - Westdeutscher Künstlerbund, Museum Bochum
 2002 – „Europa Konkret Reduktiv“, Museum Modern Art, Hünfeld 
 2003 – 30 Positionen - 30 Räume, Museum Modern Art, Hünfeld
 2005 – Konkrete Kunst in Rheinland-Pfalz, Haus Metternich, Koblenz
 2005 – „Lohn der Arbeit“ - Westdeutscher Künstlerbund, Kunstmuseum Gelsenkirchen
 2007 – Die krumme Wahrheit des Raums, Kunstbüroberlin, Berlin, Deutschland (mit Norvin Leineweber, Dirk Radtke und Heiner Thiel)
 2010 – „Landpartie“, Westdeutscher Künstlerbund, Museum Abtei Liesborn
 2017 – 25 Jahre „Kunst und Kommunikation“, Bochum

Bibliography 

 Die krumme Wahrheit des Raumes – Ausstellungskatalog Kunstbüroberlin, Bremen, Hachmannedition, 2007
 Europa Konkret Reduktiv – Ausstellungskatalog Museum Modern Art Hünfeld, 2002, Hrsg. Jürgen Blum
 Übersicht – Westdeutscher Künstlerbund – Katalog zur Ausstellung im Museum Bochum, 2002
 Logik + Poesie – Dokumentation zu einem Kolloquium im Forum Konkrete Kunst Erfurt, 2001
 Im Studium bei Erwin Heerich 1961–1987 – Buchhandlung Walther König, Köln, 2000
 Norbert Müller- Everling, Diaphainon – Ausstellungskatalog, Hrsg. Gert Fischer, darin: Pohlmann, Andreas: Diaphainon – Zu den Wandarbeiten aus Wachs von Norbert Müller-Everling – Katalog Stadtmuseum Siegburg 2000
 Kunst und Bau NRW – Ministerium f. Bauen und Wohnen, Düsseldorf, 1998
 Johannes Peter Hölzinger: “Synthese des Arts” – Die Verbindung von Kunst u. Architektur bei den Regierungsbauten auf der Hardthöhe in Bonn. Edition Axel Menges, Stuttgart/London, 1998, 
 Ingeborg Flagge (Hrsg.): Eine Architektur für die Sinne: Busmann & Haberer. Verlag Ernst & Sohn, 1996, 
 Norbert Müller- Everling: Ausstellungskatalog, Galerie am Tiergarten, Hannover, 1993

References

External links 

  Homepage von Norbert Müller-Everling
 Begehbare Ausstellung von Norbert Müller-Everling – Stadtmuseum Siegburg

1953 births
Living people
20th-century German sculptors
20th-century German male artists
German male sculptors
21st-century German sculptors
21st-century German male artists
Kunstakademie Düsseldorf alumni
Artists from North Rhine-Westphalia
People from Bergstraße (district)